Highway 25 Bridge is a concrete girder bridge that spans the Mississippi River between Monticello, Minnesota and Big Lake, Minnesota. It was built in 1988 by the Minnesota Department of Transportation and was designed by VanDoren Hazard Stallings.

The previous bridge in this location, built in 1930, was a humpback truss bridge with a decorative wrought iron railing.  One unique feature about the 1930 bridge was that it had restrooms built into the bridge, underneath the sidewalk in the southwest corner next to the bridge abutment.  The restrooms were closed in 1962 when it was determined that they could not easily be connected to the new sewage treatment plant.  Replacement restrooms were built in the nearby park.

The first bridge built at Monticello over the Mississippi River was completed in 1893. It was a wooden swing-span bridge, which could swing to allow river vessels to pass along the river.

See also
List of crossings of the Upper Mississippi River

References

 

Road bridges in Minnesota
Bridges over the Mississippi River
Bridges completed in 1930
Bridges completed in 1988
Girder bridges in the United States
Concrete bridges in the United States
Buildings and structures in Wright County, Minnesota
Buildings and structures in Sherburne County, Minnesota